The Thomas Rose House is a National Register property located at 59 Church St. in Charleston, South Carolina. The -story stuccoed brick house was probably built by planter Thomas Rose in 1733. Thomas Rose House was built on a lot granted through the King's Lords Proprietor to Elizabeth Willis in 1680 — "one of the few grants given to a woman." Thomas Rose constructed the house on the original Charles Town Lot no. 61, inherited by his wife, Beuler Elliott, replacing an earlier dwelling.  The house has excellent examples of original Georgian woodwork in the paneling, staircase, and elsewhere.  In the twentieth century an owner razed a neighboring house on the adjoining lot to the south to accommodate a large garden.

References

Robert Stockton, Information for Guides of Historic Charleston, South Carolina 190 (1985).

Houses on the National Register of Historic Places in South Carolina
Houses completed in 1733
Houses in Charleston, South Carolina
Georgian architecture in South Carolina
National Register of Historic Places in Charleston, South Carolina